Jewel Food Stores is a defunct Australian discount supermarket. It operated from 1960 to 1998 with the final stores being absorbed into the Metcash owned IGA branding. The chain was originally owned and operated by the Fleming family. It was not related to the Jewel supermarket chain in the United States.

History 
The Fleming family sold their Sydney-based Flemings supermarkets chain to Woolworths Limited in June 1960. They continued operating that chain through Woolworths for the next 10 years before acquiring the 42-store Warmans grocery chain and relaunching it as a discount supermarket under the "Jewel Food Stores" name. The generic product range was called "No Name".

Jewel was pitched as a low-price supermarket chain similar to Flemings. It was credited with bringing the food barn concept to Australia through the Jewel Food Barn format, which sold dry groceries and frozen foods only. The stores had a downmarket look similar to its major rival Franklins, another discount supermarket chain based and established in Sydney. To a lesser extent, it also competed with the Newcastle-based Shoeys discount supermarkets, later to be taken over by BI-LO from South Australia.

While Jewel found limited success in New South Wales against long-time incumbent Franklins, new stores in Victoria opened before Franklins and found success there. In the early 1990s, Jewel launched Jewel Country Fresh in response to Franklins and BI-LO launching market-style full-line discount supermarkets. Jewel also acquired the Rainbow supermarket in Doonside, Western Sydney. These formats carried not only dry groceries and frozen foods, but also fresh foods in a market-style environment.

In 1995, Jewel Food Stores Pty Ltd was acquired by Davids Holdings that later became Metcash Trading Ltd. In 1998 Davids sold 130 Jewel supermarkets to Independent Retailers for about $100 million. A number of stores closed. The Jewel name disappeared almost entirely when the Independent Retailers rationalised their 29 different grocery banners to form one, Independent Grocers of Australia (IGA). A handful of stores retained the branding beyond the rationalisation. These included a Jewel branded store in Sunshine, Victoria until 2000, and one in Lalor Park which retained the Jewel branding until 2008.

Advertising
As it was a discount supermarket, Jewel usually only advertised specials in-store, rather than advertise the specials everywhere. However, in 1995, Jewel did have an advertising campaign, emphasising on its low-price positioning. This was in the same year that the Fleming family sold the 130 Jewel supermarkets to what is now Metcash (then Davids).

See also
 Flemings
 IGA

References
 Metcash Trading Ltd 
 Marketing News McGraw Hill
 From groceries to the gallops

Defunct supermarkets of Australia
Food and drink companies disestablished in 2011
Retail companies disestablished in 2011
2011 disestablishments in Australia
Australian grocers